The London Borough of Redbridge is a London borough established in 1965.

The borough shares boundaries with the Epping Forest District and the ceremonial county of Essex to the north, with the London Borough of Waltham Forest to the west, the London Borough of Havering to the east, the London Borough of Barking and Dagenham in the south and east, and the London Borough of Newham to the south.

The principal settlements in the borough are Ilford, Wanstead, and Woodford.

Etymology
The name comes from a bridge over the River Roding which was demolished in 1921. The bridge was made of red brick, unlike other bridges in the area made of white stone. The name had first been applied to the Redbridge area and Redbridge tube station was opened in 1947. It was earlier known as Hocklee's Bridge.

Places of interest

Parks and open spaces

Redbridge has more than 35 parks, playgrounds and open spaces. These include Hainault Forest Country Park, with 300 acres of countryside including adventure play areas, cafe and petting zoo; Roding Valley Park, a wildlife sanctuary with a range of flora and fauna and woodland areas; Valentines Park, including Valentines Mansion, ornamental gardens, bowling green and outdoor gym; and Claybury Woods and Park, a conservation area that features an ancient area of oak and hornbeam woodland, meadows and wildlife ponds.

Arts and culture

Valentines Mansion is a Georgian country house and gardens in the grounds of Valentines Park, Ilford.

Kenneth More Theatre in Oakfield Road, Ilford opened in 1975.

Redbridge Museum, which opened in 2000, is situated on the second floor of Redbridge Central Library, Clements Road, Ilford, along with the Redbridge Heritage Centre.

The Embassy Cinema is an Art Deco former cinema in Chadwell Heath. It opened in 1934 and closed in 1966, but is currently the focus of a major restoration project.

Libraries
Redbridge has 13 libraries across the borough.  This includes the Redbridge Central Library, in Clements Road, Ilford, which had a major refurbishment in 2012. The libraries offer a number of services including reading clubs, story time sessions, study areas and learning resources. The libraries in Redbridge are:

Aldersbrook Library 
Clayhall Library 
Fullwell Cross Library 
Gants Hill Library 
Goodmayes Library 
Hainault Library 
Redbridge Central Library 
Keith Axon Library 
Seven Kings Library 
South Woodford Library 
Uphall School Library 
Wanstead Library 
Woodford Green Library

Sport and leisure facilities
Redbridge has a number of sports and leisure facilities including the road and off-road cycling tracks at Redbridge Cycling Centre.

There are two local football teams both playing in the Isthmian League Division One: Redbridge F.C. (not to be confused with Dagenham & Redbridge) and Ilford FC. In addition there is fellow Non-League football club Barkingside F.C. who play at The Oakside stadium.

Valentines Park in Ilford acted as one of Essex County Cricket Club's home grounds in 1923-4 and from 1935 until 2002, when the club stopped playing there due to financial constraints.

Geography

Demographics

In 2011 the population of Redbridge was recorded at 278,970. In common with the other London boroughs this continues a period of growth; between the 1991 and 2001 censuses the increase was 7.5% with a further rise of 15.3% by 2011. Redbridge has the third highest proportion of children and a higher-than-average proportion of older adults while the proportion of working age adults is slightly lower than average. The population density was last recorded at 4,945 residents per km2 (the London regional density is 5,199, far higher than the England and Wales figure of 371).

The healthy life expectancy (HLE) at birth for Redbridge residents stands at 65.5 years for males and 62.4 years for females (the England average HLE is 63.4 for males and 64.1 for females).

Redbridge is one of the most ethnically diverse local authorities in the UK. 34% of respondents to the 2011 census stated that they were born outside the UK and 65.5% identified as belonging to an ethnic group other than white British. Redbridge's largest ethnic group is White British (34.5%), followed by Indian (16.4%), and Pakistani (Redbridge has the highest proportion of Pakistani residents of any London borough).

Ethnic and religious change 
In common with many London boroughs, the most recent (2011) census showed notable ethnic and religious population mobility in Redbridge. Ethnic groups whose proportions fell in Redbridge were White British (-23% of the borough's total), Irish (-0.9%), and Caribbean (-0.6%). Ethnic groups whose proportions rose include Pakistani (+4.9%), other Asians (+4.4%), Bangladeshis (+3.9%), and other White  (+2.9%). Religious groups whose proportions fell in Redbridge were Christian (-13.9%) and Jews (-2.5%). For Jews this represented a fall of over 50% of their number in some wards. Religious groups whose proportions rose include Muslims (+11.4%) followed by Hindu (+3.6%).

Ethnicity

Religion

According to the 2021 Census, the largest religious groupings are Muslims (31.3 per cent), followed by Christians (30.4 per cent), those of no religion (12.6 per cent), Hindus (11.1 percent) no response (5.7 per cent), Sikhs (5.7 per cent), Jews (2.1 per cent), Buddhists (0.5 per cent) and other religions at (0.7 per cent).

The number of Christians in 2011  residing in Redbridge ranked fourth lowest in England and Wales, and 12 percent below the London average of 48.4%. The number of Muslims in Redbridge has more than doubled since 2001.

Transport

Walking and cycling
The Roding Valley Way is a designated walking and cycling route between Woodford and Ilford.

Elizabeth line

These services serving these stations were rebranded from TfL Rail to Elizabeth line in 2022.

London Underground
Central line: Epping Branch.

Central line: Hainault Loop (follows the route of the A12 from Wanstead to Newbury Park)

Buses

Numerous London buses run through and within the borough.

Travel to work
In March 2011, the main forms of transport that residents used to travel to work were: driving a car or van, 23.5%  all residents aged 16–74; underground, metro, light rail, tram, 18.4%; train, 6.2%; bus, minibus or coach, 4.6%; on foot, 3.7%; work mainly at or from home, 2.6%; passenger in a car or van, 1.5%.

History
The borough was formed in 1965 by the London Government Act 1963 as a merger of the former area of:

All of which had been transferred from Essex to Greater London by the Act. The former town hall in Ilford is now known as Redbridge Town Hall.

Following a review by the Local Government Boundary Commission for England, minor changes were made on 1 April 1994 to the boundary with Barking & Dagenham and Newham. Further changes were made on 1 April 1995 to the boundary with Waltham Forest and Epping Forest District. The latter change transferred an area around Grange Hill and Roding Valley tube stations from Essex to Greater London.

Awards
In November 2018, Redbridge Council was reported as the sixth-most productive council in England overall and the most productive in provision of adult social care in a report published by the public service consultancy iMPOWER.

Redbridge London Borough Council

Summary of Council results:

Education

Redbridge Council is the Local Education Authority. The Borough has the accolade of sending more young people to university than any other borough in the country in both 2011 and 2012. GCSE and A Level results are consistently higher than the Country's average. A 2017 report by Trust for London and the New Policy Institute found that Redbridge has the highest proportion of 19 year olds with Level 3 qualifications (equivalent to an A Level) of any London borough.

All schools in the borough take part in the Redbridge Schools Choral Festival, a bi-annual music festival held in the Royal Albert Hall in Knightsbridge.

Notable people

Gallery

References

External links 

 London Borough of Redbridge Council website
 Things to do in London Borough of Redbridge

 
Redbridge
1965 establishments in the United Kingdom